The Biennial of Illustration Bratislava (BIB) is one of the oldest international honours for children's book illustrators. First granted in 1967 to Yasuo Segawa (Japan), it is one of the more prestigious children's book awards today, along with the Hans Christian Andersen Award. Artists are selected by an international jury, and their original artwork is exhibited in Bratislava, Slovakia. From the very beginning BIB has been held under the auspices of UNESCO and the International Board on Books for Young People (IBBY), and with the support of the Ministry of Culture, Slovakia. There are twelve awards, including a grand prize for unique and outstanding illustration:
 1 Grand Prix
 5 Golden Apples
 5 Plaques
 1 Honorary Mention Certificate to Publisher  

In 1987 BIBIANA – International House of Art for Children was founded as a "cultural institution with international activity". BIBIANA now also organizes Biennial of Animation Bratislava (BAB).

List of Grand Prix winners 
Winning illustrations can be seen at BIBIANA web site.

List of Golden Apple Prix winners

References

External links

Biennial of Illustrations Bratislava - BIB

Children's literary awards
Awards established in 1967

1967 establishments in Czechoslovakia